is a Japanese biathlete. He competed at the 1968 Winter Olympics and the 1972 Winter Olympics.

References

1940 births
Living people
Japanese male biathletes
Olympic biathletes of Japan
Biathletes at the 1968 Winter Olympics
Biathletes at the 1972 Winter Olympics
Sportspeople from Hokkaido